Anthony Mandler (born April 18, 1973) is an American film director, music video director, television commercial director and photographer. As a music video director, his most notable and frequent collaborator is Rihanna. The two have worked on sixteen music videos together throughout her career, beginning with "Unfaithful" in 2006 and most recently "Diamonds" in 2012. He has also written and directed music videos for many other prominent artists including the Spice Girls, Jay Z, Beyoncé, Eminem, Usher, Shakira, Taylor Swift, The Killers, Selena Gomez, Justin Bieber, Christina Aguilera, 50 Cent, Ne-Yo, Nicki Minaj, Drake, Snoop Dogg, Lenny Kravitz, Cheryl Cole, M.I.A., Mary J. Blige, fun. and Lana Del Rey. Frank Gatson Jr. has choreographed many videos for Anthony Mandler including Beyonce and Rihanna clips.

Beginning his career as a photographer, Mandler's work has been featured on the covers of major magazines such as Entertainment Weekly, GQ, Esquire, Men's Health, and ESPN The Magazine. His celebrity portraits include, among others, David Beckham, Colin Farrell, James Franco, Heath Ledger, Ryan Phillippe, Eva Mendes, LeBron James, Taylor Lautner, Andrew Garfield, Kiefer Sutherland and Katie Holmes. For commercials, he has worked with international clients such as Nike, Inc., Motorola, Duracell and Cîroc.

In film, Mandler was set to make his feature film directorial debut with the film Tokyo Vice based on the Jake Adelstein book of the same name. J. T. Rogers would be providing the screenplay, with Daniel Radcliffe starring in the lead role. Mandler ultimately made his debut with the 2018 film Monster.

Personal life
Mandler was born in Los Angeles, California. He married actress Denise Vasi in October 2013. They have a daughter named Lennox Mae Mandler, who was born in February 2015.

He is Jewish.

Filmography
 Monster (2018)
Surrounded (TBA)

Videography

2000
 8Ball & MJG — "Pimp Hard" 
 4th Avenue Jones — "Respect"

2001
 Black Eyed Peas feat. Chali 2na — "Get Original"
 Laura Dawn — "I Would"

2003
 Maria — "I Give You Take"

2005
 Snoop Dogg — "Ups & Downs/Bang Out"
 M.I.A. — "Bucky Done Gun"
 Common — "Testify"
 Kem — "Find Your Way"
 50 Cent — "Hustler's Ambition"
 Sean Paul — "Ever Blazin'"
 Eminem — "When I'm Gone"
 DPGC — "Real Soon"

2006
 Nelly Furtado — "Maneater"
 Rihanna — "Unfaithful"
 Ne-Yo — "Sexy Love"
 Sleepy Brown feat. Pharrell & Big Boi — "Margarita"
 The Killers — "When You Were Young"
 Rihanna — "We Ride"
 Beyoncé — "Irreplaceable"
 Omarion — '"Ice Box"
 Jay Z feat. Chrisette Michele — "Lost One"

2007
 Duran Duran — "Falling Down"
 Beyoncé — "Get Me Bodied"
 Snoop Dogg feat. Nate Dogg — "Boss' Life"
 Fergie — "Big Girls Don't Cry"
 Rihanna — "Shut Up and Drive"
 Enrique Iglesias — "Somebody's Me"
 Rihanna feat. Ne-Yo — "Hate That I Love You"
 The Killers — "Tranquilize"
 Spice Girls — "Headlines (Friendship Never Ends)"
 Rihanna — "Don't Stop The Music"

2008
 OneRepublic — "Stop and Stare"
 Rihanna — "Take a Bow"
 OneRepublic — "Say (All I Need)"
 Bayje — "Find a Way"
 Rihanna — "Disturbia"
 Maroon 5 feat. Rihanna — "If I Never See Your Face Again"
 T.I. feat. Rihanna — "Live Your Life"
 Akon — "Right Now (Na Na Na)"
 Enrique Iglesias — "Away"
 Rihanna — "Rehab"
 Wyclef Jean feat. will.i.am, Imposs, Jimmy O & Melissa Jiménez — "Let Me Touch Your Button"

2009
 John Legend — "Everybody Knows"
 Utada — "Come Back To Me"
 Robin Thicke — "Dreamworld"
 Daniel Merriweather — "Red"
 The Killers — "A Dustland Fairytale"
 Melanie Fiona — "Give It to Me Right"
 Eminem — "Beautiful"
 Jay Z — "D.O.A. (Death of Auto-Tune)"
 Daniel Merriweather — "Impossible"
 Maxwell — "Bad Habits"
 Jay Z feat. Rihanna & Kanye West — "Run This Town"
 Mary J. Blige feat. Drake — "The One"
 Mary J. Blige — "Stronger"
 Mary J. Blige — "I Am"
 Ryan Leslie — "You're Not My Girl"
 Amerie — "Heard 'Em All"
 John Mayer — "Who Says"
 Rihanna — "Russian Roulette"
 Rihanna — "Wait Your Turn"
 Jay-Z feat. Mr Hudson — "Young Forever"

2010
 John Mayer — "Heartbreak Warfare"
 Nikki & Rich — "Next Best Thing" & "Same Kind of Man"
 Usher feat. will.i.am — "OMG"
 Drake — "Over"
 Drake — "Find Your Love"
 Muse — "Neutron Star Collision (Love Is Forever)"
 Rihanna — "Te Amo"
 Christina Aguilera — "You Lost Me"
 Usher — "There Goes My Baby"
 Drake feat. Lil Wayne — "Miss Me"
 Drake feat. T.I. & Swizz Beatz — "Fancy" (unreleased)
 Trey Songz feat. Nicki Minaj — "Bottoms Up"
 Trey Songz — "Can't Be Friends"
 Rihanna — "Only Girl (In the World)"

2011
 Romeo Santos — "Promise" (featuring Usher)
 Jennifer Hudson — "Where You At"
 Rihanna — "California King Bed", "Man Down"
 Tyler, the Creator — "She" (featuring Frank Ocean; as co-producer)

2012
 Nicki Minaj — "Starships"
 Shakira — "Addicted to You", "Dare (La La La)" (shot in 2012, released in 2014)
 Cheryl — "Call My Name", "Under the Sun"
 Fun — "Some Nights", "Carry On"
 Lana Del Rey — "National Anthem", "Ride"
 Justin Bieber — "As Long as You Love Me" (featuring Big Sean)
 Muse — "Madness"
 Rihanna — "Diamonds"
 Taylor Swift — "I Knew You Were Trouble"

2013
 Taylor Swift — "22"
 Selena Gomez — "Come & Get It"
 The Weeknd — "Belong to the World"
 Jay-Z — "Holy Grail" (featuring Justin Timberlake)
 Lana Del Rey — Tropico (short film)

2014
 Jennifer Hudson — "I Can't Describe (The Way I Feel)" (featuring T.I.)
 Jennifer Lopez — "First Love"
 Lenny Kravitz — "The Chamber"
 Shakira — "Dare (La La La)"

2015
 Nate Ruess — "Nothing Without Love"

2016
Drake — "Please Forgive Me"

2018
 Sugarland — "Babe" (featuring Taylor Swift)
 Shawn Mendes, Khalid — "Youth"

2019
Jonas Brothers — "Sucker"
Jonas Brothers — "Cool"
SZA, The Weeknd, Travis Scott — "Power Is Power"
Jonas Brothers — "Only Human"

2021
Nick Jonas — "Spaceman"

References

External links
, Black Hand Cinema

1973 births
Living people
American music video directors
Commercial photographers
Film directors from Los Angeles
Photographers from Los Angeles
Television commercial directors